Adrienne Lau (born September 7, 1983; Chinese: 劉晨芝) is a Hong Kong-American singer. Lau is the first Chinese American to hit Top 10 on the U.S. Pop Billboard Sales Chart.

Early life 
Nga Wing Lau was born in British Hong Kong in 1983. She grew up splitting her time between there and Los Angeles. Lau graduated from UCLA with double major degrees in Communications and Sociology.

Career

Her single "Wanna be Happy" debuted on the US Pop Billboard Charts at number 14 and has remained for 9 weeks. Another single ‘Magic Tricks’ reached number 7.

 named the first Chinese American to hit the U.S. Pop Billboard Sales Chart Top 20.

 Lau also did an advertising campaign and was the spokesmodel for Vigoss Jeans in China.

 In January 2005, her debut album "Hypnotic" was released. Her first single "Hypnotic Love" features Jin tha MC. Mike Tyson also made an appearance in the music video. Mýa also produced the song "Xtacy" in the album.

 Lau performed at the MTV Chi Rocks concert for MTV Chi in September 2006.

 In December 2006, Lau performed on The V Party for Channel V in Singapore.

 In March 2007, Lau made an appearance in the Bangkok International Fashion Week in Thailand with a performance on the catwalk.

 In her second self-titled album "Adrienne", Petey Pablo is featured in her single "You’re the One". She appeared in the 2006, 2007 and 2008 Grammys.

 In 2008, Lau sang the song "Olympics Beijing" ("Ao Yun Beijing") for 2008 Olympics.

 In 2010, Lau released her single "Coming" in Hong Kong. The single reached number 1 on the HMV Charts.

 started fashion business, restaurant and bar businesses in Hong Kong.

 hosting TV shows in Hong Kong, she invited her Kpop star friends to appear on Seoul Stars for TVB and she is hosting her own show for Bread TV.

In 2020, Adrienne Lau is appearing in Hollywood movie ‘The Card Counter’ executive produced by Martin Scorsese, starring Tiffany Haddish, Oscar Issaac and Wilem Dafoe.

Controversy surrounding MIG Records and Henry Jones
In the early 2000s, Lau received a record deal from Henry Jones of MIG Records (later renamed to Global Village Records). Jones used the proceeds from Tri Energy to fund his MIG Records enterprise. 
The U.S. Securities and Exchange Commission (SEC) filed a suit against Henry Jones and argued successfully that Jones was operating Tri Energy as a ponzi scheme. Although Jones (sentenced to 20 years in prison) claimed Lau had nothing to do with the scheme, and that usage of Lau's bank account was just an innocent mistake, Lau was named a Relief Defendant and ordered to pay a disgorgement of $200,000 plus pre-judgment interest of $20,000.

Videography 
 Hypnotic Love
 Magic Tricks
 You're The One

Personal life 
She speaks English, Cantonese, and Mandarin.

References

External links 
Lau on HK Magazine
Lau on Baccarat Magazine
"Adrienne Lau Breaking the Racial Barrier in Pop Music" on Spice Magazine
https://okmagazine.com/news/nightly-news-adrienne-lauasian-sensation-julie-benz-stars-new-movie/

American women singers
American musicians of Chinese descent
University of California, Los Angeles alumni
Living people
1983 births
American women pop singers
21st-century American women